Sitnica may refer to:

Sitnica, a river in Kosovo
Sitnica, Bosnia and Herzegovina, village in Ribnik, Bosnia and Herzegovina
Sitnica (Morača), a small river in Montenegro
Sitnica, Lesser Poland Voivodeship, a village in south Poland
Sitnica, Lubusz Voivodeship, a village in west Poland